Dufferin is a subway station on Line 2 Bloor–Danforth of the Toronto subway in Toronto, Ontario, Canada. It is located at Dufferin Street just north of Bloor Street West. It opened in 1966 as part of the original segment of the subway line. Wi-Fi service is available at this station.

Architecture and art

When the station first opened, the entrance on the west side of Dufferin Street had a tile back wall, a three sided glass and aluminium enclosure entrance at ground level, an opaque flat roof, red signage, and a red accent stripe. In 1974, the Dovercourt Baptist Church constructed the abutting new red brick facility and senior's residence (New Horizons Tower).  The entrance on the east side of the street is inset into the westerly facade of the Bloor Dufferin Medical Centre. Inside, smooth, unadorned green-coloured rectangular wall tiles were used, with a strip of narrower black tiles near the ceiling, and terrazzo floor tiles.

The 2010–2014 modernization of the station significantly modifies the original west entrance, updating signage, adding an elevator for accessibility, adding ceiling height and additional glazed elements, and adding a canopy covering the sidewalk. A canopy has also been added to the Bloor Dufferin Medical Centre to shelter the east side bus stops, and two additional exits have been added to Russet Ave, one block west of the main entrances. A public art component, titled Something Happens Here by Eduardo Aquino and Karen Shanski of spmb was also added, consisting of colourful mosaics of highly pixelated images of activity from the surrounding communities.  The mosaics also include numerous metallic tiles featuring local logos, icons and historical references.

Nearby landmarks

Nearby landmarks include Dufferin Mall, Bloor Collegiate Institute, Dufferin Grove Park, and the Bloor–Gladstone branch of the Toronto Public Library.

Surface connections

Transfers to buses occur at curbside stops on Dufferin Street outside the station.

TTC routes serving the station include:

Station modernization
Dufferin Station was upgraded and modernized under the TTC's Station Modernization program. Work commenced in September 2009 and was fully complete in November 2014, taking over twice the projected time to complete. The "modernization" included the installation of street level elevators for accessibility, the installation of a second entrance from Russett Avenue, two second exits (one on the northwest corner of Russet Avenue and Bloor Street, and the other on the northeast corner, providing direct access from the westbound platform), rebuilding of the bus waiting area, and new and modernized station finishes, art and lighting. The two second exits opened earlier than other improvements, in August 2013.

References

External links

Line 2 Bloor–Danforth stations
Railway stations in Canada opened in 1966